Satyaprajna Tirtha was an Indian philosopher,  Hindu spiritual leader, guru, saint and the pontiff of Uttaradi Math, a matha (mutt) dedicated to the Dvaita philosophy, which has a large following in southern India.  He was the 39th pontiff of Uttaradi Math since Madhvacharya, reformer of the Dvaita philosophy from 24 March 1942 to 14 April 1945.

References

Bibliography
 

 

Madhva religious leaders
Vaishnavism
Dvaitin philosophers
Uttaradi Math
Bhakti movement
Hindu activists
Dvaita Vedanta